Menden (Sauerland) station is a railway station in the town of Menden (Sauerland) in the German state of North Rhine-Westphalia and is served by the Hönnetal-Bahn. It is located southwest of the town centre on the Hönne. The station was built in 1872.

Station area 

The station complex once included a kiosk, a restaurant, a ticketing hall and facilities for handling baggage and clearing freight. Freight services to the station were discontinued in 1989, and the last ticketing counter closed in 2001.

The building then stood unused and fell into disrepair. It was purchased by an investor in 2009, and plans for the redevelopment of the site were discussed. 
 
After some delays, the original buildings were finally torn down and visually similar building was constructed on the site in 2012. The new building is used by various businesses and is no longer related to the railway.

Rail services 

The station is currently served by one Regionalbahn line:

Buses 

Several urban and regional bus services run from the station forecourt and the streets of Westwall and Walramstraße.

Notes

Railway stations in North Rhine-Westphalia
Railway stations in Germany opened in 1872
Menden (Sauerland)